The A200/A250 series  is a subcompact crossover SUV manufactured by Daihatsu. It was unveiled at the 46th Tokyo Motor Show on 23 October 2019 under the "New Compact SUV" name. It replaced the Be‣go in the Japanese market and went on sale on 5 November 2019.

Outside of Japan, the model is also manufactured in Indonesia and Malaysia as well. The Indonesian model of Rocky and Raize have been sold locally since April 2021 and also exported as the Raize to 50 countries. The Malaysian model is sold under the Perodua brand as the Perodua Ativa since February 2021.



Overview 
Development of the vehicle started around 2017, headed by Daihatsu chief engineer Nobuhiko Ono. Suggestions for making a larger vehicle were turned down by Ono, citing their expertise in developing kei cars. It is built on Daihatsu's DNGA platform and internally grouped as an A-segment vehicle.

Rocky's design was previewed by the 2017 DN Trec concept. The Rocky nameplate was previously used for two different (F300 and F70 series) ladder frame-based SUV models and was reused after a 17-year hiatus. The A200 series Rocky is only available in Japan, with models produced in Indonesia designated as A250 series. The A250 model is identified by the more pronounced rear bumper, a metal tailgate instead of plastic and slightly wider body than the A200 model. With its width under , the Japanese-spec Rocky is compliant with the Japanese government's dimension regulations regarding compact cars which reduce tax liability.

The first two engines is mated to either a 5-speed manual transmission or a "Dual-Mode CVT" (D-CVT). The hybrid-electric variant uses a series hybrid drivetrain, marketed as "e-Smart Hybrid" for Daihatsu and "Hybrid Synergy Drive" for Toyota.

In D-CVT, unlike traditional units, the transmission does not rely solely on belt drive, but also combining it with split gears. From low to medium speeds, the D-CVT functions like other CVT systems, while at higher speeds, the D-CVT shifts into its split mode, engaging the gear drive to achieve less energy loss. Daihatsu claimed the D-CVT was the world's first split-gear CVT system and would achieve improved fuel efficiency, acceleration feel and quietness.

Markets

Japan 
Initially, the Rocky was offered in L, X, G and Premium grade levels in Japan, which were all powered by a 1KR-VET engine with four-wheel drive option available for every grade. In November 2021, the G grade was removed and the Premium grade was replaced by Premium G. The 1KR-VET engine option for front-wheel drive models was also replaced by the WA-VE unit used earlier in the Indonesian market Rocky.

The hybrid-electric variant, which is introduced in the same month, is available in X and Premium G grades. Four-wheel drive option is not offered for this variant. The exterior received minor makeover with a mesh grille, different alloy wheels with 5 lugs, blue accent on Daihatsu's badges and "e-Smart Hybrid" badge on the tailgate to distinguish it from the conventional petrol models.

Indonesia 
The Rocky was unveiled in Indonesia alongside the Raize on 28 April 2021 and went on sale on 30 April 2021. Daihatsu invested Rp 1.7 trillion for the production tooling for their Karawang assembly plant, achieving around 70 percent of locally produced parts. In Indonesia, the Rocky is offered in M, X and R grade levels with either a manual transmission or CVT. The M and X grades are powered by the WA-VE engine, while the R grade is powered by the 1KR-VET unit. Astra Daihatsu Styling (ADS) package and Advanced Safety Assist (ASA) driver-assistance system are also available as an option. The 1.2-litre model has been available since June 2021.

Toyota Raize 

The Toyota-badged model is sold and marketed as the Toyota Raize in Japan and most international markets. It is mostly identical with the Rocky, differentiated by its front fascia which adopted Toyota's corporate look. The international (A250) model, mainly sold for emerging markets, is manufactured in Indonesia by Astra Daihatsu Motor.

The name Raize is derived from a combination of the words rise and raise, which according to Toyota, signifies an "active car that energises everyday life".

Markets

Asia

Japan 
In Japan, the Raize replaces the J200 series Rush. It is offered in X, X"S", G and Z grade levels, with each grade has a four-wheel drive option. In November 2021, similar to the Rocky, the 1KR-VET engine option for regular front-wheel drive models was replaced by the WA-VE unit. The hybrid-electric variant was also introduced for G and Z grades as well.

Indonesia 
In Indonesia, the Raize is offered in G and GR Sport grade levels. The G grade is powered by either a WA-VE or 1KR-VET engines mated to either a manual transmission or a CVT, while the GR Sport grade is only offered with the latter engine option mated to a CVT and also available with ASA (marketed as Toyota Safety Sense) as an option.

Cambodia 
The Cambodian market Raize was launched on 22 September 2021. It is only available in a single grade with a 1KR-VET engine mated to a CVT.

Brunei 
The Bruneian market Raize was launched on 30 October 2021. It is offered in E (with a WA-VE engine) and G (with a 1KR-VET engine) grades, both mated to a CVT.

Vietnam 
The Vietnamese market Raize was launched on 4 November 2021. Like the Cambodian model, it is only available in a single grade with a 1KR-VET engine mated to a CVT. GR Sport aerokits are available as an option.

Philippines 
The Philippine market Raize was launched on 4 February 2022. It is offered in E (with a WA-VE engine mated to either a 5-speed manual or a CVT), G (also with a WA-VE engine mated to a CVT) and Turbo (with a 1KR-VET engine mated to a CVT) grade levels. GR Sport aerokits are available as an option. At its launch, Toyota Motor Philippines targeted sales of 1,000 units per month.

Americas

Mexico 
The Mexican market Raize went on sale in late 2021. It is only available in a single grade, XLE with a 1KR-VET engine, mated to either a 5-speed manual or a CVT.

Subaru Rex 
The Subaru-badged model is sold and marketed exclusively in Japan as the Subaru Rex since 11 November 2022. Sharing the identical styling (except emblems) with the Rocky, it is offered in G and Z grade levels with a WA-VE engine mated to a CVT. Four-wheel drive option (typical for Subaru vehicles) is not offered for the Rex. The production is capped at 150 units per month.

Perodua Ativa 
The Perodua Ativa was opened for booking on 19 February 2021 and launched in Malaysia on 3 March 2021. The name Ativa is derived from the Portuguese word ativo, meaning active or to get active. It is the first Perodua model to be built on the DNGA platform, the first Perodua with a turbocharged engine and the first one to use a CVT. It is only available with a 1KR-VET engine, and offered in X, H and AV grade levels. It is identified by the A270 model code.

This is due to the distinct design of the bumpers and a different suspension setup specific to the Ativa which rode higher and firmer. The Ativa also uses a metal tailgate like the A250 Rocky and Raize.

According to the company, the Ativa is built with 95 percent of locally produced parts, which is the highest ever of any Perodua model. Its engine is made by Perodua Engine Manufacturing in Rawang, Selangor, while its CVT is produced at Akashi Kikai in Sendayan, Negeri Sembilan.

In September 2022, the Japan-built Ativa Hybrid was launched as part of the subscription program for an "electric vehicle study" and "long-term mobility as a service market study". 300 units of the vehicle, which itself is an hybrid-electric Rocky with Perodua badges, were imported. The cars were not intended for retail sales.

Safety

Recall 
In January 2022, Daihatsu issued a recall notice on 3,421 units of the Japanese market Rocky e-Smart Hybrid produced from 1 November to 3 December 2021, which involved an anomaly in the control unit for the hybrid powertrain. The company stated that the affected units may have had a faulty ECU that may see "improper power generation", in which the internal combustion engine could stop while the vehicle is being driven. The problem would be solved by reprogramming the ECU itself.

In March 2022, another recall issued for the Indonesian market Rocky and Raize, which both models received improper welding on the front fender aprons. These could cause abnormal sounds when the car passes through a damaged or bumpy road and under certain conditions, the aprons could possibly detach from the car. A total of 9,378 Rockys (produced from 28 April until 7 October 2021) and 14,777 Raizes (produced from November 2020 until October 2021) were affected.

Sales 
In 2020, the Raize became the second best-selling regular car model (non-kei models) in Japan, after the Yaris series, which includes the regular Yaris hatchback, the GR Yaris and the Yaris Cross.

Daihatsu Rocky

Toyota Raize

Perodua Ativa

Subaru Rex

References

External links 

  (Rocky, Japan)
  (Raize, Japan)

Rocky (A200)
Cars introduced in 2019
2020s cars
Mini sport utility vehicles
Crossover sport utility vehicles
Front-wheel-drive vehicles
All-wheel-drive vehicles
Hybrid sport utility vehicles
Partial zero-emissions vehicles
Vehicles with CVT transmission
ASEAN NCAP small off-road